Sounds...and Stuff Like That!! is a 1978 studio album by Quincy Jones.

Track listing
 "Stuff Like That" (Ashford & Simpson, Steve Gadd, Eric Gale, Quincy Jones, Ralph MacDonald, Richard Tee) – 6:17
 "I'm Gonna Miss You in the Morning" (Tom Bahler, Quincy Jones, Ralph MacDonald) – 3:31
 "Love, I Never Had It So Good" (Patti Austin, Tom Bahler, Quincy Jones, Richard Tee) – 5:14
 "Tell Me a Bedtime Story" (Herbie Hancock) – 6:46
 "Love Me by Name" (Lesley Gore, Ellen Weston) – 4:10
 "Superwoman (Where Were You When I Needed You)" (Stevie Wonder) – 5:26
 "Takin' It to the Streets" (Michael McDonald) – 4:24

Personnel

Performance
Quincy Jones - arranger, conductor
Valerie Simpson - vocalist 
Chaka Khan - vocalist
Patti Austin - vocalist
Charles May - vocalist
Luther Vandross - vocalist
Gwen Guthrie - vocalist
Nick Ashford - vocalist
Harry Lookofsky - violin
Eric Gale - guitar 
Melvin "Wah-Wah Watson" Ragin - guitar
David T. Walker - guitar
Bill Lamb - guitar
Steve Gadd - drums, percussion
Ralph MacDonald - drums, percussion
Bob James - keyboards
Herbie Hancock - keyboards, electric piano, synthesizer
Anthony Jackson - bass guitar
Hubert Laws - flute, saxophone
Tom Scott - tenor saxophone, Lyricon, flute
Richard Tee - Fender Rhodes piano
Jon Faddis - trumpet
Oscar Brashear - trumpet
Robert Payne - trombone 
Virgil Jones - alto saxophone
Alan Raph - trombone
Snooky Young - trumpet
George Young - tenor saxophone
David Tofani - alto saxophone
David G. Duke - alto saxophone
Bill Perkins - alto saxophone
Garnett Brown - trombone
Michael Boddicker - synthesizer
Chuck Findley - trumpet, flugelhorn, trombone
Harold Vick - baritone saxophone, tuba
Michael Brecker - tenor saxophone

Certifications

References

1978 albums
Quincy Jones albums
Albums arranged by Quincy Jones
Albums produced by Quincy Jones
A&M Records albums